Pencil pine is a common name for several plants and may refer to:

 Athrotaxis cupressoides - Native to Tasmania, Australia
 Cupressus sempervirens - Native to the eastern Mediterranean region and widely planted as ornamentals in gardens